The 2008–09 Algerian Women's Championship was the tenth season of the Algerian Women's Championship, the Algerian national women's association football competition. It was also the first one under its new national format. ASE Alger Centre won the championship for the seventh consecutive time and for the heith time of its history.

Teams

Results

References

External links
Algeria (Women) 2009 - [Rec.Sport.Soccer Statistics Foundation|rsssf]

Algerian Women's Championship seasons